Nanhai Guanyin Temple is a Buddhist temple located at the foot of Niugugang, in Nanhai District of Foshan, Guangdong, China.

History
Nanhai Guanyin Temple was built in the 5th year of Period Chunhua (990) in the Northern Song dynasty (960-1127). At that time it bore the name Nanhai Guanyin Palace. The temple was enlarged burned, and rededicated several times throughout Chinese history till now, the present version was completed in 1996. On February 12, 1996, the temple was officially opened to the public. On December 29, 1996, abbot Shi Xincheng held the canonization ceremony of the newly reconstruction temple. The then Venerable Master of the Chinese Buddhists Association Zhao Puchu inscribed a plaque "Nanhai Guanyin Temple" for the temple.

Architecture
Along the central axis are Paifang, Heavenly Kings Hall, Mahavira Hall and Guanyin Hall. There are over 20 halls and rooms on both sides, including Bell Tower, Drum Tower, Sixth Patriarch Huineng Hall, Abbot Hall, Monastic Dining Hall, Monastic Reception Hall and Meditation Hall. Among these, Guanyin Hall is the main hall to enshrine Guanyin Bodhisattva.

Gallery

References

Tourist attractions in Foshan
Buildings and structures in Foshan
Buddhist temples in Guangdong
Nanhai District
Guanyin temples
1996 establishments in China
20th-century Buddhist temples
Religious buildings and structures completed in 1996